Gary George Inness (May 28, 1949 – February 23, 2021) was a Canadian professional ice hockey goaltender and teacher.

Playing career
Gary Inness took an unusual route to the NHL. After playing Junior B with the Weston Dodgers, Inness then went to McMaster University in Ontario for 4 years, playing both football as a centre and hockey for his university team. Inness then played one year with the University of Toronto, winning the CIAU championship while completing his teachers certificate. 

Inness never had aspirations of playing in the National Hockey League (NHL), instead thinking he would be a teacher in Ontario. However, the Pittsburgh Penguins invited him to training camp and Inness signed as a free agent with them in 1973. Inness played for parts of almost three seasons in Pittsburgh before he was traded to the Philadelphia Flyers.  After his stint with the Flyers, he played for two seasons in the World Hockey Association (WHA) with the Indianapolis Racers, playing with a 17 year old Wayne Gretzky.  When the Racers folded in December of 1978, he returned to the NHL by signing with the Washington Capitals, with whom he played for parts of three seasons before retiring at the end of the 1980–81 NHL season.

Upon retiring from NHL play, Inness happened to be in Hershey, Pennsylvania, when Hershey Bears coach Bryan Murray was promoted to coach the parent Washington Capitals. Being in the right place at the right time, Inness was hired to coach the Bears until being replaced midway through the 1984-85 AHL season.

Post-hockey career
Inness worked as a teacher, and then a guidance Councillor at Barrie North Collegiate Institute up until early 2010, after which he retired. He was well known for his involvement with coaching in the school, and remained an important part of its history. He died on February 23, 2021, from complications of dementia.

References

External links

1949 births
2021 deaths
Canadian ice hockey coaches
Canadian ice hockey goaltenders
Hershey Bears coaches
Hershey Bears players
Indianapolis Racers players
Philadelphia Flyers players
Pittsburgh Penguins players
Ice hockey people from Toronto
Toronto Varsity Blues ice hockey players
Undrafted National Hockey League players
Washington Capitals players